Mike Iaquaniello (born February 13, 1968) is a former American football defensive back. He played for the Miami Dolphins in 1991.

References

1968 births
Living people
American football defensive backs
Michigan State Spartans football players
Miami Dolphins players